Zoomorphic architecture is the practice of using animal forms as the inspirational basis and blueprint for architectural design.  "While animal forms have always played a role adding some of the deepest layers of meaning in architecture, it is now becoming evident that a new strand of biomorphism is emerging where the meaning derives not from any specific representation but from a more general allusion to biological processes."

The practice is said by some to be a reaction against some of the modern schools of architecture, such as Modernism and their apparent opposition to nature and organic form.  Commenting on the movement away from these rigid and artificial design trends, Susannah Hagan, in her book Taking Shape, has this to say: "The oppositions between culture and nature, so importantly and brutally drawn up by modernism, are dissolving again, not in a return to what was, but a transformation of it...The division between the living organism and the machine continues to collapse."

Famous works

Some well-known examples of zoomorphic architecture can be found in the TWA Flight Center building in New York City, by Eero Saarinen, or the Milwaukee Art Museum by Santiago Calatrava, both inspired by the form of a bird’s wings.
The Oriental Village by the Sea by Basil Al Bayati which "is based upon Oriental building types arranged in a plan originating in patterns of insect and plant life.  The exoskeleton of a dragonfly forms the main body of the building's layout, its triangular mouth of stairs on the waterfront leading to the creature's circular head of the entrance lobby. The insect's long segmented yellow body is the central corridor, dome-lit, which intertwines with a branch of a tree, its stem a road and its leaves the roofs of condominiums and leisure facilities.  The colourful berries are cone-topped villas intended to be reminiscent of Chinese temples."

Architects who have used zoomorphism in their work
Basil Al Bayati
Le Corbusier
Eero Saarinen
Fariborz Sahba
Santiago Calatrava

References

Architectural styles